Ron Lynn is the current director of player development for Stanford University football. He also served as defensive coordinator for Stanford from 2008 to 2009, and was a defensive coordinator in the NFL for 11 seasons from 1986–96. His coordinating stints were with the San Diego Chargers (1986–91), Cincinnati Bengals (1992–93), and Washington Redskins (1994–96).

Coaching Timeline
1967-1973 Mount Union College (DB)
1974-1976 Kent State University (DB)
1977-1978 San Jose State University (DB)
1979 University of Pacific (DB)
1980 University of California (DB)
1981-1982 University of California (DC)
1983-1985 Oakland Invaders (DC)
1986-1991 San Diego Chargers (DC)
1992-1993 Cincinnati Bengals (DC)
1994-1996 Washington Redskins (DC)
1997-1999 New England Patriots (DB)
2000-2003 Oakland Raiders (DB)
2004 San Francisco 49ers (DB)
2008-2009 Stanford University (AHC/Co-DC)

References 

Living people
San Diego Chargers coaches
Cincinnati Bengals coaches
Washington Redskins coaches
Stanford Cardinal football coaches
National Football League defensive coordinators
Year of birth missing (living people)